is a graffiti artist from East Los Angeles. He is a member of LA graffiti crews K2S (Kill 2 Succeed) and KGB (Kids Gone Bad).

Background and education
He was born in 1972 to Japanese parents. Fujita holds an MFA from the University of Nevada, Las Vegas and a BFA from Otis College of Art and Design.

Career
Fujita's work has been widely exhibited at galleries and museums such as Los Angeles County Museum of Art (LACMA), Kemper Museum of Contemporary Art (Kansas City), L.A. Louver Gallery and several international venues in Switzerland, Greece, Australia and Belgium. He is represented by L.A. Louver in Venice, CA.

Style
Fujita blends Eastern techniques (anime, partitioned screens, ukiyo-e), and elements (geishas, warriors, demons), with Western, urban imagery (Latino graffiti, U.S. pop culture imagery) in a way that is stunning and vibrant, yet harmonious. His works embody the cultural and class contradictions that are an integral part of urban Los Angeles.

In 2005 he exhibited with Pablo Vargas-Lugo at the Los Angeles County Museum of Art. In 2012, five of his works were shown at the Pacific Asia Museum in Pasadena, California.

Selected solo exhibitions
 The Kemper Museum of Contemporary Art, Kansas City, MO, 2006
 Kravets/Wehby Gallery, New York, NY, 2003
 LA Louver Gallery, Los Angeles, CA, 2002
 Weatherspoon Art Museum, Greensboro, NC, 2002

See also
L.A. Louver Gallery

References

External links
 ArtScene article by Marlena Donahue
 LA Louver Gallery
 Kravets/Wehby Gallery
 NYFA Interactive
 Otis College of Art and Design: Gajin Fujita Outstanding Alumni

1972 births
Living people
American contemporary artists
American graffiti artists
Japanese graffiti artists
American artists of Japanese descent
Otis College of Art and Design alumni